James Shaquelle Christopher Fenlon (born 15 March 1994) is an English semi-professional footballer who plays for Combined Counties Premier Division club Walton & Hersham as a full-back.

An AFC Wimbledon youth product, he made 41 first-team appearances before a move to Ross County in July 2014. Upon his release, he joined Hayes & Yeading United in January 2015, before a move to Leatherhead in September 2016. He joined Walton Casuals in December 2016 and signed for local rivals Walton & Hersham in July 2017.

Career

Youth 
Living in Australia for six years, Fenlon played for Western Australia state and Stirling Lions - a club that competed in the West State League, one stage lower than the Australian A-League. Upon his return to England he joined AFC Wimbledon U16s.

AFC Wimbledon
On 18 May 2012, Fenlon signed his first professional contract with the Dons. His first involvement came as an unused substitute in a 3-1 League Cup First Round defeat at Stevenage on 14 August.

On 21 August, he made his Football League debut as a half-time substitute for Warren Cummings in a 6–2 defeat to Burton Albion. He made his first start for the club four days later in a 5–1 defeat at Bradford City. Fenlon scored his first professional goal in a 3–2 defeat to Oxford United on 2 October.

On 6 June 2014, it was announced that Fenlon had been offered a new contract but could not come to an agreement with the club. Manager Neal Ardley revealed the Fenlon was offered reduced terms due to the club's budget situation and, according to Ardley, Fenlon's attitude.

Ross County
In July 2014, Fenlon signed for Scottish Premiership club Ross County. He made his debut on 10 in a 2–1 defeat to St Johnstone on 10 August. With County struggling in the league, Fenlon also featured in defeats to Partick Thistle, Dundee United and Aberdeen while being named as an unused substitute on two occasions.

On 26 August, he recorded his first victory for the club in a 2-1 Scottish League Cup win at Stranraer. His final appearance for the club came in a 2-0 League Cup defeat to Hibernian on 23 September.

On 28 November, Fenlon's contract was terminated by mutual consent.

Hayes & Yeading United
In January 2015, Fenlon signed for Conference South club Hayes & Yeading United. In May 2015, he was named Player's Player of the Year at the club's annual award ceremony.

Leatherhead 
In September 2016, Fenlon completed a move to Isthmian League Premier Division outfit Leatherhead. On 14 September, he made his debut in an Isthmian League Cup First Round victory over Walton Casuals.

Fenlon made his league debut a week later in a 1–1 draw with Needham Market. Making 14 appearances in all competitions for the Tanners, his final outing came in a 3–1 victory at Hendon on 10 December.

Walton Casuals 
On 30 December 2016, Fenlon joined Isthmian League Division One South side Walton Casuals. He made his debut the following day a 1–0 victory against Carshalton Athletic.

Fenlon scored his first goal in almost five years, and his only for the club, in a 5–1 defeat at Faversham Town on 4 February 2017. He left the club at the end of the season.

Walton & Hersham 
In July 2017, he joined local rivals Walton & Hersham in the Combined Counties Premier Division. Fenlon made his debut on the opening day of the season in a 7–0 FA Cup win against Mile Oak.

On 10 October 2017, Fenlon became the club's first player to score at the Elmbridge Xcel Sports Hub – their new ground shared with Walton Casuals – in a 6–1 Combined Counties Challenge Cup victory against Badshot Lea. Five days later, he scored against from the penalty spot in a 2–0 win at Horley Town. On 21 October, Fenlon scored his third penalty of the season in a 3–3 draw against Balham.

Statistics

References

1994 births
Living people
English footballers
Association football defenders
AFC Wimbledon players
English Football League players
Ross County F.C. players
Scottish Professional Football League players
Hayes & Yeading United F.C. players
Walton Casuals F.C. players
National League (English football) players
Southern Football League players
Isthmian League players
Walton & Hersham F.C. players